Nahum Parker (March 4, 1760November 12, 1839) was a United States senator from New Hampshire.

Parker was born in Shrewsbury, Massachusetts. During the Revolutionary War he served in the Continental Army at the Battle of Saratoga in 1777. He settled in Fitzwilliam, New Hampshire in 1786, was a member of the board of selectmen from 1790 to 1794 and clerk and town treasurer from 1792 to 1815.

Parker was a member of the New Hampshire House of Representatives from 1794 to 1804 and in 1806–1807; in 1804 and 1805 he was a member of the Governor's council. He was elected as a Democratic-Republican to the U.S. Senate and served from March 4, 1807, to June 1, 1810, when he resigned.

From 1807 to 1813, Parker was a justice of the Court of Common Pleas for Cheshire and Sullivan Counties. He was associate justice of the western circuit from 1813 to 1816 and a judge of the court of sessions of Cheshire County in 1821 and of the court of common pleas of Hillsborough County in 1822. He was a member of the New Hampshire Senate and its president in 1828.

Parker died in Fitzwilliam, New Hampshire in 1839, aged 79, and was interred in the Town Cemetery.

References

External links
 

1760 births
1839 deaths
Members of the New Hampshire House of Representatives
People from Shrewsbury, Massachusetts
Continental Army soldiers
New Hampshire state court judges
New Hampshire state senators
United States senators from New Hampshire
People from Fitzwilliam, New Hampshire
New Hampshire Democratic-Republicans
Democratic-Republican Party United States senators
Presidents of the New Hampshire Senate
People of colonial Massachusetts